Twoja twarz brzmi znajomo (Polish: Your Face Sounds Familiar) is a Polish talent show developed by Polsat and based on the Spanish version of the series. The show is presented by Maciej Rock and Maciej Dowbor, whilst the judging panel consists of Paweł Domagała, Małgorzata Walewska and Robert Janowski.

The show involves eight celebrities (singers, actors and television personalities) portraying various iconic singers each week to win 10,000 PLN for their chosen charity.

Format
The show challenges celebrities (singers and actors) to impersonate different music artists every week, which are chosen by the show's "Randomiser". Afterwards they are judged by the panel of celebrity judges. The 'randomiser' can choose any older or younger artist available in the machine, or even a singer of the opposite sex, or a deceased singer. The winner of each episode wins 10,000 PLN, and the winner of the whole show wins 100,000 PLN. All money goes for a charity of their choice.

Voting
The contestants are awarded points from the judges (and each other) based on their singing and dance routines. The points go from 1 to 7 and 10, with 10 being the judge's favorite of the night. After that, each contestant gives 5 points to a fellow contestant of their choice (known as "Bonus" points) and from the 18th edition they award 4 points. The judges' score is combined with the "Bonus" points.

Cast

Hosts
Key
 Main host

Judges
Key
 Main judge
 Contestant

Coaches
Key
 Vocal coach
 Dance coach

Series overview

Season 1 (2014) 
The first season premiered on 8 March 2014-26 April 2014. Piotr Gąsowski and Maciej Dowbor were the hosts. The judges were Paweł Królikowski, Katarzyna Kwiatkowska, DJ Adamus and Małgorzata Walewska.

Contestants

Season 2 (2014) 
The second season premiered on 6 September 2014-22 November 2014. Piotr Gąsowski and Maciej Dowbor returned as the hosts. The judges were Paweł Królikowski, DJ Adamus, Małgorzata Walewska and, replacing Katarzyna Kwiatkowska, Katarzyna Skrzynecka.

Contestants

Season 3 (2015) 
The third season premiered on 7 March 2015-9 May 2015. Piotr Gąsowski and Maciej Dowbor returned as the hosts. The judges were Paweł Królikowski, Katarzyna Skrzynecka, DJ Adamus and Małgorzata Walewska.

Contestants

Season 4 (2015) 
The fourth season premiered on 5 September 2015-7 November 2015. Piotr Gąsowski and Maciej Dowbor returned as the hosts. The judges were Paweł Królikowski, Katarzyna Skrzynecka, DJ Adamus and Małgorzata Walewska.

Contestants

Season 5 (2016) 
The fifth season premiered on 12 March 2016-14 May 2016. Piotr Gąsowski and Maciej Dowbor returned as the hosts. The judges were Paweł Królikowski, Katarzyna Skrzynecka, Małgorzata Walewska and, replacing DJ Adamus, Bartłomiej Kasprzykowski.

Contestants

Season 6 (2016) 
The sixth season premiered on 3 September 2016-19 November 2016. Piotr Gąsowski and Maciej Dowbor returned as the hosts. The judges were Paweł Królikowski, Katarzyna Skrzynecka, Małgorzata Walewska and Bartłomiej Kasprzykowski.

Contestants

Season 7 (2017) 
The seventh season premiered on 4 March 2017-6 May 2017. Piotr Gąsowski and Maciej Dowbor returned as the hosts. The judges were Paweł Królikowski, Katarzyna Skrzynecka, Małgorzata Walewska and Bartłomiej Kasprzykowski.

Contestants

Season 8 (2017) 
The eighth season will premiere on 9 September 2017-11 November 2017. Piotr Gąsowski and Maciej Dowbor will return as the hosts. The judges will be Paweł Królikowski, Katarzyna Skrzynecka, Małgorzata Walewska and Bartłomiej Kasprzykowski.

Contestants

Season 9 (2018) 
The ninth season premiered on 3 March 2018-19 May 2018. Piotr Gąsowski and Maciej Dowbor returned as the hosts. The judges were Paweł Królikowski, Katarzyna Skrzynecka and Małgorzata Walewska. Bartłomiej Kasprzykowski was replaced by Kacper Kuszewski as new judge. Joanna Liszowska appeared as a guest judge, replacing Małgorzata Walewska in the fifth episode.

Contestants

Season 10 (2018) 
The tenth season premiered on 8 September 2018-17 November 2018. Piotr Gąsowski and Maciej Dowbor returned as the hosts. The judges were Paweł Królikowski, Katarzyna Skrzynecka, Małgorzata Walewska and Kacper Kuszewski. Stefano Terrazzino appeared as a guest judge, replacing Małgorzata Walewska in the eighth episode.

Contestants

Season 11 (2019) 
The eleventh season premiered on 23 February 2019-18 May 2019. Piotr Gąsowski and Maciej Dowbor returned as the hosts. The judges were Paweł Królikowski, Katarzyna Skrzynecka, Małgorzata Walewska and Kacper Kuszewski. Piotr Polk appeared as a guest judge, replacing Małgorzata Walewska in the tenth episode. Paweł Królikowski could not appear in the final as a juror because of illness.

Contestants

Season 12 (2019) 
The twelfth season premiered on 7 September 2019-23 November 2019. Piotr Gąsowski and Maciej Dowbor returned as the hosts. The judges were Paweł Królikowski, Katarzyna Skrzynecka, Małgorzata Walewska and Kacper Kuszewski. Kazimierz Mazur appeared as a guest judge, replacing Kacper Kuszewski in the eleventh episode.

Contestants

Season 13 (2020) 
The thirteenth season premiered on 7 March 2020-14 March 2020 to 5 September 2020-7 November 2020 due to the COVID-19 pandemic. Piotr Gąsowski and Maciej Dowbor returned as the hosts. The judges were Katarzyna Skrzynecka, Małgorzata Walewska and Kacper Kuszewski. Paweł Królikowski, due to his death on 27 February 2020, was replaced by Adam Strycharczuk as a new judge.

Contestants

Christmas episode 1 (2020) 
The Christmas episode premiered on December 18, 2020. The contestants were four women and five men:

 Gosia Andrzejewicz, Katarzyna Dąbrowska, Ewelina Lisowska, Katarzyna Skrzynecka
 Paweł Dudek, Marek Kaliszuk, Filip Lato, Adam Strycharczuk, Stefano Terrazzino

Season 14 (2021) 
The fourteenth season premiered on 5 March 2021-14 May 2021. Piotr Gąsowski and Maciej Dowbor returned as the hosts. The judges were Katarzyna Skrzynecka, Małgorzata Walewska, Kacper Kuszewski and Adam Strycharczuk. Due to the COVID-19 epidemic, the edition was carried out without the participation of the public, except for the final episode.

Contestants

Season 15 (2021) 
The fifteenth season premiered on 10 September 2021-12 November 2021. Piotr Gąsowski and Maciej Dowbor returned as the hosts. The judges are Katarzyna Skrzynecka and Małgorzata Walewska. Kacper Kuszewski and Adam Strycharczuk was replaced by Michał Wiśniewski and Gromee as new judges. Sławomir Zapała appeared as a guest judge, replacing Małgorzata Walewska in the fourth episode. Stefano Terrazzino appeared as a guest judge, replacing Katarzyna Skrzynecka in the fifth episode.

Contestants

Christmas episode 2 (2021) 
The Christmas episode premiered on December 17, 2021. The contestants were five women and four men:

 Gosia Andrzejewicz, Agnieszka Hekiert, Barbara Kurdej-Szatan, Joanna Liszowska, Katarzyna Skrzynecka
 Robert Janowski, Sławomir Zapała, Adam Zdrójkowski, Lesław Żurek

Season 16 (2022) 
The sixteenth season premiered on 4 March 2022-13 May 2022. Piotr Gąsowski and Maciej Dowbor returned as the hosts. The judges are Katarzyna Skrzynecka, Małgorzata Walewska and Michał Wiśniewski. Gromee was replaced by Krzysztof Cugowski as new judge. Krzysztof Cugowski in the 2nd and 3rd episodes of the 16th edition, he did not appear in the studio of the program due to being in quarantine, which caused him to connect remotely. Robert Janowski appeared as a guest judge, replacing Michał Wiśniewski in the fourth episode. Due to the COVID-19 epidemic, audiences were wearing masks for five episodes, but audiences were maskless for the remainder of the episodes.

Contestants

Season 17 (2022) 
The seventeen season premiered on 2 September 2022-4 November 2022. Piotr Gąsowski and Maciej Dowbor returned as the hosts. The judges are Katarzyna Skrzynecka, Małgorzata Walewska and Michał Wiśniewski. Krzysztof Cugowski was replaced by Robert Janowski as new judge. Lesław Żurek appeared as a guest judge, replacing Michał Wiśniewski in the fourth episode.

Contestants

Season 18 (2023) 
The eighteenth season premiered on 3 March 2023-12 May 2023. Maciej Dowbor returned as the host. Piotr Gąsowski was replaced by Maciej Rock as the host. Małgorzata Walewska and Robert Janowski returned as the judges. Michał Wiśniewski and Katarzyna Skrzynecka were both replaced by Paweł Domagała as the new judge - for the first time in the show's history, the participants will be assessed by three judges. Also for the first time, one of the contestants was not a celebrity and had to win an audition; Daniel Jaroszek was later announced to be the winner of the audition as the eighth contestant. The scoring rules have also changed. Now the participants give each other 4 points. Anna Dereszowska appeared as a guest judge, replacing Małgorzata Walewska in the fourth episode.

Contestants

Results summary

Performances

Special episodes

Viewing figures

References

External links
Official website

2014 Polish television series debuts
Polish reality television series
Your Face Sounds Familiar
2010s Polish television series
2020s Polish television series
Polsat original programming